Wikibon is a community of practitioners and consultants on technology and business systems that uses open source sharing of free advisory knowledge. The company was launched in 2007 by David Vellante, David Floyer and Peter Burris and is headquartered in Marlborough, Massachusetts. Wikibon has approximately 5 employees.

Content
Wikibon compares itself to technology research services such as Gartner and International Data Corporation. Unlike them, its research is available under a GNU General Public License.
Wikibon's research is created and made available in the form of a wiki, enabling contributors to post content, add to existing content, and offer changes and amendments.

In 2008, Wikibon introduced “Conserve IT”,  to help IT companies and customers qualify for rewards from Pacific Gas and Electric Company for installing energy-efficient equipment.

Wikibon holds calls to allow IT practitioners to share information it calls Peer Incite.
Wikibon creates and shares infographics, and covers topics such as cloud computing, big data, and virtualization on its blog.
Forbes magazine called a Wikibon report estimating the size of the "big data" market "groundbreaking" in 2012.

References

Further reading
Wexler, Steve (March 2, 2011). HP Storage Blitz Leverages 3PAR Acquisition. Network Computing
Schillinger, Raymond (March 18, 2011). Surviving the Data Deluge: a Call to Action for the 21st Century. The Huffington Post

External links
Official Website

Research and analysis firms